AJ Styles and Omos were a professional wrestling tag team in WWE on the Raw brand. The team were former WWE Raw Tag Team Champions. In October 2020, Omos debuted as Styles' "personal colossus" and aided him in his matches. At WrestleMania 37 in April 2021, Styles and Omos won the Raw Tag Team Championship and held it for 133 days before losing them at SummerSlam in August of that year.

History

Formation (2020–2021) 

After the departures of Luke Gallows and Karl Anderson in April 2020, which led to the dissolution of The O.C., AJ Styles was drafted to the Raw brand in October 2020 as part of the 2020 Draft. On the October 19 episode of Raw, Styles debuted a new bodyguard, Omos, before defeating Riddle. At TLC: Tables, Ladders & Chairs, Styles faced Drew McIntyre for the WWE Championship in a TLC match but failed to win as The Miz unsuccessfully cashed in his Money in the Bank briefcase during the match; Omos was involved in the match, preventing Miz from reaching the title and dropping him onto a table placed outside the ring before chasing John Morrison to the back. On January 31, 2021 at Royal Rumble, during the Royal Rumble match, Omos involved himself by preventing Styles from being eliminated on a few occasions. Omos eliminated Big E and Rey Mysterio despite not being in the match. He would also go on to help Styles enter the Elimination Chamber match early before being ejected by WWE official Adam Pearce.

Raw Tag Team Champions (2021) 
On the March 22 episode of Raw, Styles and Omos challenged The New Day (Kofi Kingston and Xavier Woods) to a championship match at WrestleMania 37 which The New Day accepted. At WrestleMania, Styles and Omos captured the Raw Tag Team Championship and in the process, Styles also became the twenty-second WWE Grand Slam Champion, and the first to achieve both the WWE and Impact Grand Slam. Over the following months, Styles and Omos successfully defended the titles in rematches with The New Day and against Elias and Jaxson Ryker before entering into a feud with The Viking Raiders (Erik and Ivar). At the Money in the Bank event, Styles and Omos successfully defended the titles against The Viking Raiders. After this, Styles and Omos began feuding with Riddle and Randy Orton, who make the team of RK-Bro. After weeks of confronting each other, a match was made between Styles and Omos, and RK-Bro at SummerSlam for the titles. At the event, Styles and Omos lost the titles to RK-Bro, ending their reign at 133 days. 

At Extreme Rules, Styles and Omos teamed with Bobby Lashley to take on The New Day in a six-man tag team match, in which Styles, Omos, and Lashley lost. After this, it was announced that Styles and Omos would face RK-Bro in a rematch for the tag team titles at Crown Jewel. At the event, they failed to regain the titles. On the December 20 episode of Raw, after weeks of tension and speculation, Omos would attack Styles, breaking up the tag team.

Championships and accomplishments 
 WWE
 WWE Raw Tag Team Championship (1 time)
 Thirty-second Triple Crown Champion – Styles
 Fifteenth Grand Slam Champion (under current format; Twenty-second overall) – Styles
The Rock's 25th Anniversary 25-Man Battle Royal – Omos

References

External links
 AJ Styles & Omos Profile at Cagematch.net
 
 

WWE teams and stables